Mottrom Dulany Ball (June 23, 1835 – September 13, 1887) was an American lawyer, newspaper publisher, Confederate Army officer and collector of customs for the United States Department of the Treasury. From March 27, 1878, to June 13, 1879, he was the highest-ranking federal official in the Department of Alaska, making him the de facto governor of the territory. In 1881, he won an election to be Alaska's first territorial delegate in the United States House of Representatives, but the United States House Committee on Elections did not recognize the results, and he was not seated.

Mottrom Drive in McLean, Virginia, is named for Ball.

Notes

References

External links
 
 M. D. Ball Papers. Yale Collection of Western Americana, Beinecke Rare Book and Manuscript Library.

1835 births
1887 deaths
Commanders of the Department of Alaska
19th-century American politicians